Creepin' may refer to:
 "Creepin'" (Eric Church song), a song by American country music singer Eric Church (2012)
 "Creepin'" (Metro Boomin, the Weeknd and 21 Savage song), a song by American producer Metro Boomin, Canadian singer The Weeknd and rapper 21 Savage (2022)